Barlow Pass (elevation ) is a mountain pass on the west side of the Cascades in Washington on the Mountain Loop Highway between Silverton and Darrington. It is a popular trail head for access to the old mining town of Monte Cristo and has a branch off to hike up to Gothic Basin, which is about a mile in.

The mining boom at Monte Cristo, starting in 1890, resulted in the need for access to the remote town. In 1891 a wagon road was built along the Sauk River, from the Skagit River to Monte Cristo. That same year it was discovered that Monte Cristo could be accessed via the South Fork Stillaguamish River. A surveyor named J.Q. Barlow blazed a route from Silverton to Monte Cristo. Mining interests funded further work and soon a wagon road was built over Barlow Pass to join the Sauk wagon road. Later a railroad would be built over the same route.

References

Mountain passes of Washington (state)
Mountain passes of the North Cascades
Landforms of Snohomish County, Washington